Tahannaout or Tahnaout is a town and commune, capital of Al Haouz Province of the Marrakesh-Safi region of Morocco. It contains a Jewish cemetery.

References

Populated places in Al Haouz Province
Rural communes of Marrakesh-Safi
Tahannaout